Red Cloud High School may refer to:

Red Cloud High School (Nebraska) in Red Cloud, Nebraska
Red Cloud High School (South Dakota) in Pine Ridge, South Dakota